Vices is the second studio album by American rapper Paradime. It was released on October 23, 2001 via Beats At Will Records. Recording sessions took place at Nation Studios in Detroit and Audio Magic in Eastpointe. It featured guest appearances by the likes of Kon Artis and Swifty McVay of D12, Shi Dog and Guilty Simpson of the Almighty Dreadnaughtz, Cansa and Hush, among cameo appearances by Proof, Uncle Kracker and Hex Murda.

Following the release of Vices, Paradime won three Detroit Music Awards in 2002 for Outstanding Hip-Hop Recording, Outstanding Hip-Hop Artist, and Outstanding Hip-Hop MC.

Track listing

Personnel 
 Byron Simpson – guest artist
 Daniel Carlisle – guest artist, producer
 Denaun Porter – guest artist, producer
 Fred Beauregard – main artist, producer
 Michael Earl Clark – producer
 Ondre Moore – guest artist
 Scott Sumner – producer

References 

2001 albums
Paradime albums
Albums produced by Mr. Porter
Albums produced by Mike E. Clark